Marak may refer to:
Maraq (disambiguation)

Places 
Marak, Iran, a village in South Khorasan Province, Iran
 Marak, Texas
Bukit Marak (Marak Hill), village in Bachok, Kelantan, Malaysia

People 
Adolf Lu Hitler Marak (born c. 1958), Indian politician (Nationalist Congress Party)
Julius Mařák (1832–1899), Czech landscape painter
Otakar Mařák (1872–1939), Czech opera singer
Paul Marak (born 1965), American baseball player
S. C. Marak, Indian politician (Nationalist Congress Party)
Elstone D Marak, Indian Nationalist Congress Party politician
Phillipole Marak, Indian National People's Party politician
Zbyněk Mařák (born 1971), Czech ice hockey player